Sir John Bolles, 4th Baronet (1669–1714), of Scampton, Lincolnshire, was an English politician.

He was a Member (MP) of the Parliament of England for Lincoln in 1690–1702.

References

1669 births
1714 deaths
People from Scampton
English MPs 1690–1695
English MPs 1695–1698
English MPs 1698–1700
English MPs 1701
English MPs 1701–1702
Baronets in the Baronetage of England